Mladen Brestovac (born October, 1983) is a Croatian heavyweight Muay Thai kickboxer, currently signed to Final Fight Championship, where he is the current FFC Heavyweight champion, and GLORY. He previously competed in K-1 and SUPERKOMBAT.

He was named Croatian K-1 Fighter of the Year in 2013 by a jury of experts made of Fight Channel members, kickboxing coaches and sports journalists. Mirko Filipović, as one of the best Croatian kickboxers of all time, was out of competition.

Combat Press has ranked him the #6 heavyweight in the world between December 2019 and January 2021. He's been continually ranked in the heavyweight top ten by Combat Press since December 2016.

Career

K-1
Brestovac participated in the 2008 K-1 Fighting Network Austria tournament. He achieved stoppage victories against Andreas Peters in the quarterfinal and Renato Sini in the semifinal, before winning the tournament through a unanimous decision against Roman Kleibl in the final.

After winning the tournament, Brestovac had three fights in the regional circuit, scoring knockouts of Armin Zahirović, Janos Rafief-Arifov and Attila Mathe, before taking part in the 2009 K-1 Rules Tournament in Budapest. He won a unanimous decision against Joachim Thomas in the quarterfinal, knocked Máté Zentai out with a head kick in the semifinal and won the tournament with an extra round decision against Sebastian Ciobanu. In his next fight he won the 2009 K-1 Mlada Boleslav ColliZion tournament, despite winning only the semifinal bout Libor Polach, as the other finalist, Lubomir Šuda, was unable to fight due to an injury.

In October 2014, Brestovac defeated Koos Wessels by unanimous decision, to qualify to the 2009 K-1 ColliZion Final Tournament. Brestovac scored knockouts of Mihaiţă Golescu in the quarterfinal and Coco Rus in the semifinal, before facing Roman Kleibl in the final. The final went into two extra rounds, before Kleibl won the decision.

Brestovac then went on a 4–0–1 run, notably defeating Jan Soukup and winning the rematch with Roman Kleibl.

SUPERKOMBAT
He subsequently signed with SUPERKOMBAT, and was immediately placed in the 2011 SUPERKOMBAT World Grand Prix II. He defeated Mighty Mo by a body kick KO in the semifinals, but lost the final bout against Ismael Londt by TKO, after the ringside doctor stopped the fight in the first round.

After a TKO win against Mourad Bouzidi, in March 2012, Brestovac fought the first match, of what would be their trilogy, against Benjamin Adegbuyi. Adegbuyi won the semifinal bout of the 2012 SUPERKOMBAT World Grand Prix III by unanimous decision.

Brestovac was scheduled to fight Chinese giant Taishan in a non-tournament bout at the K-1 World Grand Prix 2012 Final in Zagreb, Croatia on March 15, 2013. However Taishan was replaced, and Brestovac defeated Frank Muñoz via unanimous decision.

GLORY and FFC debuts
He took unanimous decision win against Sergei Lascenko, after being the better and more active fighter during the fight. Brestovac achieved effective damage with punch&kick combinations, with his left kick doing lots of damage to Lascenko's body. Lascenko, who replaced Michael Duut, had moments of danger during the fight, but not enough to take the victory. The fight was held at the Final Fight Championship 3 event in Zadar, Croatia on May 10, 2013. He beat Ali Cenik by decision at Final Fight Championship 8 in Zagreb, Croatia on October 25, 2013.

In November, 2013 Brestovac signed for world top promotion, Glory. He made his debut in his hometown Zagreb at the Glory 14: Zagreb event facing Jahfarr Wilnis, defeating him with left high kick in the first round.

He defeated Tomas Pakutinskas at FFC Futures 2 on May 5, 2014 after he suffered arm injury early in round one. Tomas was late replacement for Wiesław Kwaśniewski. He fought, on June 24, 2014 in Slovenia against Tomaž Simonič, who replaced Nikolai Falin. Brestovac scored another victory on points, scoring a knockdown in third round with a flying knee. He was next scheduled to fight Nikolaj Falin in Jue 2014, but Falin would later withdraw and be replaced by Tomaž Simonič. He defeated Simonič by unanimous decision. Returning to FFC, he scored a TKO win against Luca Panto, who suffered an arm injury in the first round.

He became the La Nuit Des Champions K-1 rules heavyweight +100 kg champion by defeating Nicolas Wamba on November 22, 2014 in Marseille, France. Wamba was counted two times before end of second round, when his corner threw towel because of injury.

FFC and GLORY title fights
Brestovac fought Wiesław Kwaśniewski at FFC: Super Final for the vacant FFC Heavyweight title. He defeated Kwaśniewski by a second round TKO. He was scheduled to defend his title four months later, against Colin George. Brestovac won the fight just 27 seconds into the fight, breaking George's arm as he tried to block a body kick.

He was supposed to replace Benjamin Adegbuyi to fight Anderson Silva on May 8, 2015 at Glory 21: San Diego event, however the Brazilian failed hus medical test and that fight was cancelled. He instead took part in the 2015 Glory Heavyweight Contender tournament, fighting Benjamin Adegbuyi in the semifinals. Adegbuyi won the fight by TKO, dropping Brestovac trice in the third round.

Following his first loss in over three years, Brestovac was scheduled to defend his NDC title against Fabrice Aurieng in November 2015. Aurieng won the fight by unanimous decision. 

Despite the two fight losing skid, Brestovac was nonetheless scheduled to fight Rico Verhoeven at Glory 28 for the Glory Heavyweight title. Brestovac lost the fight by unanimous decision (49–46, 50–45, and 50–45).

FFC title reign and Verhoeven rematch
After these three losses, Brestovac defended his FFC title against Steve Banks. Brestovac snapped his losing streak with a second round head kick knockout of Banks.

Brestovac participated in the 2016 Glory Heavyweight Contender tournament, being scheduled to fight Jahfarr Wilnis in the semifinals. He knocked Wilnis out with a head kick in the first round, and advanced to the finals, where he was to fight a rematch with Benjamin Adegbuyi. Adegbuyi won the fight by unanimous decision.

He was scheduled to defend the FFC title for the second time against Daniel Lentie at FFC 27. Brestovac won the fight by unanimous decision. He then defended his title for the third time against Dževad Poturak at FFC 29, winning by unanimous decision.

After two consecutive title defenses, Brestovac fought Hesdy Gerges at Glory 45. He knocked Gerges out with a head kick, after 36 seconds of the first round. He then challenged Rico Verhoeven at Glory 54 for the second time, but would once again lose by unanimous decision with 50–45 on all five scorecards.

He defended the FFC title for the fourth time against Jhonata Diniz at FFC 31, who he knocked out with a head kick in the third round.

2019 doping suspension
Brestovac wouldn't fight in 2019, as in January of the same year, it was announced by GLORY that Brestovac was one of four fighters to have failed their doping tests, testing positive for meldonium. He was given a 19 month suspension, applied retroactively from the Glory 54 event, which effectively ended on December 1, 2019.

Titles

Professional competition
 Final Fight Championship 
 FFC Heavyweight Championship (one time, current) (5 Title Def.)

 Glory
 2016 Glory Heavyweight (+95 kg/209.4 lb) Contender Tournament Runner-up 

 Nuit des Champions
 2014 NDC K-1 Rules Heavyweight +100 kg Champion

 SUPERKOMBAT Fighting Championship
 2011 SUPERKOMBAT World Grand Prix II Runner-up

 K-1
 2009 K-1 ColliZion 2009 Final Tournament Runner-up
 2009 K-1 ColliZion 2009 Mlada Boleslav Tournament Champion
 2009 K-1 Rules Tournament in Budapest Champion
 2008 K-1 Vienna Tournament Champion

Accolades
2013 Croatian K-1 Fighter of the Year

Kickboxing record (Incomplete)

|-
|-  bgcolor="#CCFFCC"
| 2018-10-12 || Win ||align=left| Jhonata Diniz || FFC 31: Las Vegas || Las Vegas, Nevada || KO (Left High Kick) || 3 || 1:36
|-
! style=background:white colspan=9 |
|-  bgcolor="FFBBBB"
| 2018-06-02 || Loss ||align=left| Rico Verhoeven || Glory 54: Birmingham || Birmingham, England || Decision (Unanimous) || 5 || 3:00
|-
! style="background:white" colspan=9 |
|-
|-  bgcolor="#CCFFCC"
| 2017-09-30 || Win ||align=left| Hesdy Gerges || Glory 45: Amsterdam || Amsterdam, Netherlands || KO (Left High Kick) || 1 || 0:36
|-
|-  bgcolor="#CCFFCC"
| 2017-04-22 || Win ||align=left| Dževad Poturak || FFC 29 || Ljubljana, Slovenia || Decision (Unanimous) || 3 || 3:00
|-
! style=background:white colspan=9 |
|-
|-  bgcolor="#CCFFCC"
| 2016-12-17 ||  Win||align=left| Daniel Lentie || FFC 27: Night of Champions || Zagreb, Croatia || Decision (Unanimous) || 3 || 3:00
|-
! style=background:white colspan=9 |
|-
|-  bgcolor="FFBBBB"
| 2016-11-05 || Loss ||align=left| Benjamin Adegbuyi || Glory 35: Nice, Final || Nice, France || Decision (Unanimous) || 3 || 3:00
|-
! style=background:white colspan=9 |
|-
|-  bgcolor="#CCFFCC"
| 2016-11-05 || Win ||align=left| Jahfarr Wilnis || Glory 35: Nice, Semi Finals || Nice, France || TKO (Left High Kick) || 1 || 2:06
|-
|-  bgcolor="#CCFFCC"
| 2016-06-04 || Win ||align=left| Steve Banks || FFC 24: Villefort vs Rela || Daytona Beach, Florida, USA || TKO (Left High Kick) || 2 || 2:42
|-
! style=background:white colspan=9 |
|-
|-  bgcolor="FFBBBB"
| 2016-03-12 || Loss ||align=left| Rico Verhoeven || Glory 28: Paris || Paris, France || Decision (Unanimous) || 5 || 3:00
|-
! style="background:white" colspan=9 |
|-
|- bgcolor="#FFBBBB"
| 2015-11-14 || Loss ||align=left| Fabrice Aurieng || La 22ème Nuit Des Champions || Marseille, France || Decision || 5 || 3:00
|-
! style=background:white colspan=9 |
|-
|-  bgcolor="FFBBBB" 
| 2015-10-09 || Loss ||align=left| Benjamin Adegbuyi || Glory 24: Denver, Semi Finals || Denver, Colorado, USA || TKO (Low Kicks) || 3 || 1:47  
|-
|-  bgcolor="#CCFFCC"
| 2015-04-17 || Win ||align=left| Colin George || FFC18: Ljubljana || Ljubljana, Slovenia || TKO (Arm Injury) || 1 || 0:27
|-
! style=background:white colspan=9 |
|-  bgcolor="#CCFFCC"
| 2014-12-20 || Win ||align=left| Wiesław Kwaśniewski || FFC Super Final || Opatija, Croatia || TKO || 2 || 0:45
|-
! style=background:white colspan=9 |
|-  bgcolor="#CCFFCC"
| 2014-11-22 || Win ||align=left| Nicolas Wamba || La 21ème Nuit des Champions || Marseille, France || RTD (Injury) || 2 || 3:00 
|-
! style=background:white colspan=9 |
|-
|-  bgcolor="#CCFFCC"
| 2014-09-26 || Win ||align=left| Luca Panto || FFC Futures 3, Super Fight  || Zagreb, Croatia || TKO (Arm Injury) || 1 || 1:06
|-
|-  bgcolor="#CCFFCC"
| 2014-06-24 || Win ||align=left| Tomaž Simonič || K1 International Fight Night  || Čatež ob Savi, Slovenia || Decision (Unanimous) || 3 || 3:00
|-
|-  bgcolor="#CCFFCC"
| 2014-05-03 || Win ||align=left| Tomas Pakutinskas || FFC Futures 2, Super Fight || Opatija, Croatia || TKO (Arm Injury) || 1 || 0:36
|-
|-  bgcolor="#CCFFCC"
| 2014-03-08 || Win ||align=left| Jahfarr Wilnis || Glory 14: Zagreb ||Zagreb, Croatia || KO (Left High Kick) || 1 || 1:19  
|-
|-  bgcolor="#CCFFCC"
| 2013-12-13 || Win ||align=left| Kirk Krouba || FFC10: Rodriguez vs. Batzelas || Skopje, Macedonia || Decision (Unanimous) || 3 || 3:00
|-
|-  bgcolor="#CCFFCC"
| 2013-10-25 || Win ||align=left| Ali Cenik || FFC08: Zelg vs. Rodriguez || Zagreb, Croatia ||Decision (Unanimous) ||3 ||3:00 
|-
|-  bgcolor="#CCFFCC"
| 2013-05-10 || Win||align=left| Sergei Lascenko || FFC04: Perak vs. Joni || Zadar, Croatia || Decision (Unanimous) || 3 ||3:00  
|-  bgcolor="#CCFFCC"
| 2013-03-15 ||Win ||align=left| Frank Muñoz || K-1 World Grand Prix 2012 Final, Super Fight || Zagreb, Croatia || Decision (Unanimous) || 3 || 3:00 
|-  bgcolor="#CCFFCC"
| 2013-02-23 || Win ||align=left| Andy Van Steen || SUPERKOMBAT New Heroes 1 || Opatija, Croatia || TKO (Left High Kick) || 1 || N/A
|-  bgcolor="#FFBBBB"
| 2012-07-07 || Loss ||align=left| Benjamin Adegbuyi || SUPERKOMBAT World Grand Prix III 2012, Semi Finals || Varna, Bulgaria || Decision (Unanimous) || 3 || 3:00
|-  bgcolor="#CCFFCC"
| 2012-03-10 || Win ||align=left| Mourad Bouzidi || Cro Cop Final Fight || Zagreb, Croatia || TKO (Injury) || 1 || 0:30
|-  bgcolor="#FFBBBB"
| 2011-07-16 || Loss ||align=left| Ismael Londt || SUPERKOMBAT World Grand Prix II 2011, Final || Constanța, Romania || TKO (Referee Stoppage)|| 1 || 0:55
|-
! style=background:white colspan=9 |
|-  bgcolor="#CCFFCC"
| 2011-07-16 || Win ||align=left| Mighty Mo || SUPERKOMBAT World Grand Prix II 2011, Semi Finals || Constanța, Romania || KO (Left Body Kick) || 1 || 2:18
|-  bgcolor="#CCFFCC"
| 2011-05-01 || Win ||align=left| Tihamer Brunner || Fight Code: Dragons Round 3 || Budapest, Hungary || KO || 1 || 1:06
|-  bgcolor="#CCFFCC"
| 2010-10-09 || Win ||align=left| Roman Kleibl || TK2 tournament in Marseille || Marseille, France || KO (Right High Kick) || 1 || 1:55
|-  bgcolor="#CCFFCC"
| 2010-05-21 || Win ||align=left| Jan Soukup || K-1 World Grand Prix 2010 in Bucharest || Bucharest, Romania || Decision (Unanimous) || 3 || 3:00
|-  bgcolor="#c5d2ea"
| 2010-04-24 || Draw ||align=left| Reamon Welboren || Gotti Promotion presents: Apocalix || Milan, Italy || Draw || 3 || 3:00
|-  bgcolor="#CCFFCC"
| 2010-03-27 || Win ||align=left| Mihaiţă Golescu || K-1 ColliZion 2010 Croatia || Split, Croatia || TKO (Doctor Stoppage) || 2 || 3:00
|-  bgcolor="#FFBBBB"
| 2009-12-12 || Loss ||align=left| Roman Kleibl || K-1 ColliZion 2009 Final Tournament || Prague, Czech Republic || 2 Ext. R Decision || 5 || 3:00
|-
! style=background:white colspan=9 |
|-
|-  bgcolor="#CCFFCC"
| 2009-12-12 || Win ||align=left| Coco Rus || K-1 ColliZion 2009 Final Tournament || Prague, Czech Republic || TKO (Corner Stoppage) || 1 || 1:57
|-  bgcolor="#CCFFCC"
| 2009-12-12 || Win ||align=left| Mihaiţă Golescu || K-1 ColliZion 2009 Final Tournament || Prague, Czech Republic || KO (Left Knee Strike) || 3 || 2:00
|-  bgcolor="#CCFFCC"
| 2009-10-24 || Win || align=left| Koos Wessels || K-1 ColliZion 2009 Final Elimination || Arad, Romania || Decision (Unanimous) || 3 || 3:00
|-  bgcolor="#CCFFCC"
| 2009-05-16 || Win ||align=left| Libor Polach || K-1 ColliZion 2009 Mlada Boleslav, Semi Finals || Mlada Boleslav, Czech Republic || KO (Knee Strike) || 2 || N/A
|-
! style=background:white colspan=9 |
|-
|-  bgcolor="#CCFFCC"
| 2009-02-28 || Win ||align=left| Sebastian Ciobanu || K-1 Rules Tournament 2009 in Budapest || Budapest, Hungary || Ext. R Decision (Unanimous) || 4 || 3:00
|-
! style=background:white colspan=9 |
|-
|-  bgcolor="#CCFFCC"
| 2009-02-28 || Win ||align=left| Máté Zentai || K-1 Rules Tournament 2009 in Budapest || Budapest, Hungary || KO (Left High Kick) || 1 || 2:46
|-  bgcolor="#CCFFCC"
| 2009-02-28 || Win ||align=left| Joachim Thomas || K-1 Rules Tournament 2009 in Budapest || Budapest, Hungary || Decision (Unanimous) || 3 || 3:00
|-  bgcolor="#CCFFCC"
| 2008-10-26 || Win ||align=left| Attila Mathe || King of Colosseum - European Final Fight 2008 || Ljubuški, Bosnia and Herzegovina || KO || N/A || N/A
|-  bgcolor="#CCFFCC"
| 2008-10-19 || Win ||align=left| Janos Rafief-Arifov || Lords of the Ring || Vienna, Austria || KO || 2 || 2:09
|-  bgcolor="#CCFFCC"
| 2008-07-25 || Win ||align=left| Armin Zahirović || Božić vs Aramjan WBA title Fight Night || Novalja, Pag, Croatia || TKO || 1 || N/A
|-  bgcolor="#CCFFCC"
| 2008-05-17 || Win ||align=left| Roman Kleibl || K-1 Fighting Network Austria 2008 || Vienna, Austria || Decision (Unanimous) || 3 || 3:00
|-
! style=background:white colspan=9 |
|-
|-  bgcolor="#CCFFCC"
| 2008-05-17 || Win ||align=left| Renato Sini || K-1 Fighting Network Austria 2008 || Vienna, Austria || KO (Left High Kick) || 1 || 1:40
|-  bgcolor="#CCFFCC"
| 2008-05-17 || Win ||align=left| Andreas Peters || K-1 Fighting Network Austria 2008 || Vienna, Austria || TKO (Corner Stoppage) || 1 || 1:53
|-  bgcolor="#CCFFCC"
| 2008-03-29 || Win ||align=left| Kristof Kristodopulous || Božić vs Selini WBA title Fight Night || Široki Brijeg, Bosnia and Herzegovina || KO (Knee Strike) || 1 || 2:21
|-  bgcolor="#CCFFCC"
| 2007-12-15 || Win ||align=left| Tihamer Brunner || Ultimate Fight Challenge 2 || Samobor, Croatia || Decision (Split) || 3 || 3:00
|-  bgcolor="#CCFFCC"
| 2005-12-18 || Win ||align=left| Johan Mparmpagiannis || Heaven or Hell 6 || Prague, Czech Republic || Decision (Unanimous) || 3 || 3:00
|-  bgcolor="#FFBBBB"
| 2005-11-25 || Loss ||align=left| Cheick Kongo || King of Colloseum 2005 || Mostar, Bosnia and Herzegovina || Decision (Split) || 3 || 3:00
|-  bgcolor="#CCFFCC"
| 2005-11-25 || Win ||align=left| Elvedin Tukić ||  King of Colosseum 2005 || Mostar, Bosnia and Herzegovina || TKO || N/A || N/A
|-  bgcolor="#CCFFCC"
| 2005-08-19 || Win ||align=left| Nicolae Moroşanu || K-1 Hungary Grand Prix 2005 || Debrecen, Hungary || KO || 1 || 2:13
|-  bgcolor="#FFBBBB"
| 2005-05-06 || Loss ||align=left| Alexander Ustinov || K-1 Slovakia 2005 || Bratislava, Slovakia || KO || N/A || N/A
|-  bgcolor="#FFBBBB"
| 2004-12-20 || Loss ||align=left| Vitali Akhramenko || Heaven or Hell 5 || Prague, Czech Republic || Decision (Unanimous) || 3 || 3:00
|-  bgcolor="#FFBBBB"
| 2004-06-11 || Loss ||align=left| Duško Basrak || K-1 Grand Prix BIH 2004 || Široki Brijeg, Bosnia and Herzegovina || Decision (Split) || 3 || 3:00
|-  bgcolor="#CCFFCC"
| 2004-06-11 || Win ||align=left| Nikolaus Tsoukalas || K-1 Grand Prix BIH 2004 || Široki Brijeg, Bosnia and Herzegovina || Decision (Unanimous) || 3 || 3:00
|-  bgcolor="#CCFFCC"
| 2004-05-15 || Win ||align=left| Amir el Alfy || Muay Thai Gala, Sporthal Zilvermeeuwen || Amsterdam, Netherlands || TKO (Corner Stoppage) || 2 || 0:00
|-  bgcolor="#FFBBBB"
| 2004-04-08 || Loss ||align=left| Bjorn Bregy || Heaven or Hell 4 || Prague, Czech Republic || TKO (Eye Injury) || 2 || N/A
|-  bgcolor="#CCFFCC"
| 2004-02-07 || Win ||align=left| Duško Basrak || Croatia vs Serbia Kickboxing || Valpovo, Croatia || Decision (Split) || 3 || 3:00
|-  bgcolor="#CCFFCC"
| 2003-12-21 || Win ||align=left| Dženan Muminović || WKA European championship || Sarajevo, Bosnia and Herzegovina || KO || 3 || 1:32
|-  bgcolor="#CCFFCC"
| 2003-10-25 || Win ||align=left| Dženan Muminović || Memorijal Ludvig Pavlović || Ljubuški, Bosnia and Herzegovina || TKO || 1 || N/A
|-  bgcolor="#FFBBBB"
| 2003-05-10 || Loss ||align=left| Evgeny Orlov || K-1 World Grand Prix 2003 Preliminary Milan || Milan, Italy || KO || 4 || 2:40
|-  bgcolor="#CCFFCC"
| 2003-04-13 || Win ||align=left| Jeno Beck || Noć Gladijatora || Osijek, Croatia || KO || 1 || 0:32
|-  bgcolor="#CCFFCC"
| 2002-12-21 || Win ||align=left| Miroslav Kasaja || Vanocni Lucernu || Prague, Czech Republic || KO || 2 || 1:45
|-
| colspan=9 | Legend:

See also
List of K-1 events
List of K-1 champions
List of male kickboxers

References

Croatian male kickboxers
Heavyweight kickboxers
Croatian Muay Thai practitioners
Sportspeople from Zagreb
Living people
1983 births
Glory kickboxers
SUPERKOMBAT kickboxers
Doping cases in kickboxing
Croatian sportspeople in doping cases